Alexander Ogilvie Walker Anderson (20 February 1930 – July 2016) was a Scottish professional footballer who played in the Football League for Southend United.

References

1930 births
2016 deaths
Scottish footballers
Association football defenders
English Football League players
Southend United F.C. players
Folkestone F.C. players